Slovenská elektrizačná prenosová sústava (SEPS) is the electricity transmission system operator in Slovakia.

In 2019, the company transmitted 28,619,358 GWh of electrical energy. It had 3,007,729 km of transmission lines: 2,138,282 at the 400 kV level, 825,886 at 220 kV and 79,796 at 110 kV.

In 2019, the company had 546 employees and its revenue was 371.67 mil. EUR. Since February 2021, the CEO is Peter Dovhun.

Galery

See also

Energy in Slovakia

References

External links
 Company website
 Grid maps

Electric power transmission system operators in Slovakia
Companies based in Bratislava
Energy companies established in 2002